Alibeyli is a village in Tarsus district of Mersin Province, Turkey. The population of the village was 308  as of 2012. The main agricultural product of the village is grape.

References

Villages in Tarsus District